Nikolas Theodorou (born 17 September 2000) is a Greek chess player who holds the title of Grandmaster (GM, 2021). He is a Chess Olympiad individual silver medal winner (2022).

Biography 
Nikolas Theodorou was born in Athens in 2000. In 2006 his family moved to Atsipopoulo in Rethymno for business reasons. He grew up there, where he finished elementary school.

In Rethymnon, Nikolas Theodorou attended high school. He was an excellent student and in 2018 he graduated from the Experimental High School of Rethymnon.

From a very young age (2007) Nikolas Theodorou started chess lessons at the Chess Club of Rethymno. Since 2015 he has been a student of the Chania Chess Academy.

Nikolas Theodorou has taken part in many pan-Hellenic and international chess tournaments. In 2022, with the chess team of the Saint Louis University, he achieved first place in the Final Four of the USA Collegiate Chess.

Nikolas Theodorou played for Greece in the European Team Chess Championship:
 In 2017, at third board in the 21st European Team Chess Championship in Hersonissos (+3, =1, -3).

Nikolas Theodorou played for Greece in the Chess Olympiad:
 In 2022, at second board in the 44th Chess Olympiad in Chennai (+6, =3, -0) and won individual silver medal.

In 2016, he was awarded the FIDE International Master (IM) title and received the FIDE Grandmaster (GM) title five years later.

In May 2022, Nikolas Theodorou received his bachelor's degree with a double major in Physics and Mathematics, from Saint Louis University in the USA. For the next two years (from August 2022) he will be doing postgraduate studies in the Biostatistics & Health Analytics program at the same university and with a renewed full scholarship to continue his participation in the university chess team.

References

External links 

2000 births
Living people
Sportspeople from Athens
Chess grandmasters
Greek chess players
Saint Louis University alumni
People from Rethymno (regional unit)
21st-century Greek people